was a Buddhist disciple of Nichiren and the uncle of Nichirō. He was the only disciple who was actually older than Nichiren himself.

He was a Tendai priest in his youth, and after Nichiren's death he continued to claim that he was merely carrying out a reform of this sect. He founded Myōhokke-ji in 1284. His Hama-ha subsect continued to hold good relations with the Tendai sect.

External links 
 The Six Major Disciples of Nichiren

1236 births
1323 deaths
Japanese Buddhist clergy
Nichiren-shū Buddhist monks
Nichiren Buddhism
Kamakura period Buddhist clergy